All Africa Music Awards (also referred to as AFRIMA) is an annual awards event. The awards event was established by the International Committee AFRIMA, in collaboration with the African Union (AU) to reward and celebrate musical works, talents and creativity around the African continent while promoting the African cultural heritage. Its pioneer Awards show was held in 2014.

History

Nigeria has hosted three of the award editions during 2014–2016. Nigeria once again won the fourth-year hosting rights tenure in 2017. However, the Republic of Ghana was given the right to host the All Africa Music Awards for four consecutive years from December 2018 to 2020. On Monday, July 15, 2019, The International Committee of the All Africa Music Awards, (AFRIMA) withdrew the hosting rights from Republic of Ghana for the 2019 and  2020 editions of the All Africa Music Awards, AFRIMA, over lack of capacity by the Host Country to meet the financial and contractual obligations entered to on July 12, 2018, necessary to retain hosting the biggest music event in Africa. Due to the Covid-19 outbreak in 2020, AFRIMA did not hold as scheduled but returned in 2021 and was hosted in Lagos, Nigeria.

Organisation
The International Committee of AFRIMA consists of five regions: SADEC, Eastern Africa, Central Africa, Northern, Southern Africa and Western Africa, which are run by regional directors and 54 country directors. Public votes determine which artists get awarded, alongside a jury of experienced African culture, media and music industry experts/professionals.

Host cities

Award categories
These awards consist of 37 prizes of two categories: region-based awards (covering the five African regions) overseeing the achievements of African artistes within their specific regions of origin and the genre-based continental awards.

Regional Awards 
Best Female Artiste in Central Africa
Best Male Artiste in Central Africa
Best Female Artiste in Western Africa
Best Male Artiste in Western Africa
Best Female Artiste in Eastern Africa
Best Male Artiste in Eastern Africa
Best Female Artiste in Northern Africa
Best Male Artiste in Northern Africa
Best Female Artiste in Southern Africa
Best Male Artiste in Southern Africa.

Continental Awards 
Artiste of the Year
African Fans' Favorite
Album of the Year
Best African Collaboration
Best African Contemporary
Best African Electro
Best African Group/Duo/Band
Best African Hip Hop
Best African Jazz
Best African Pop
Best African Reggae/Ragga/Dancehall
Best African RnB/Soul
Best African Rock
Best African Traditional
Best Female Inspirational
Best Male Inspirational
Best African DJ
Best African Lyricist/Rapper
Best African Act in Diaspora
Best African Dance/Choreography
AFRIMA Legend Award
Most Promising Artiste of the Year
Producer of the Year
Revelation of the African Continent
Song of the Year
Songwriter of the Year
Video of the Year.

Past award winners

2014 Edition

2015 Edition

2016 Edition

2017 Edition

2018 Edition

References 

International music awards
Awards established in 2014
African music awards
2014 in Nigerian music